1984 is a 1965 album by Yusef Lateef.

Track listing

Personnel

Performance
 Yusef Lateef – flute, oboe, tenor saxophone
 Mike Nock – piano
 Reggie Workman – double bass
 James Black – drums, percussion, indian bells

References

1965 albums
Yusef Lateef albums
Albums produced by Bob Thiele
Albums recorded at Van Gelder Studio
Impulse! Records albums
Instrumental albums